Novruzallı (also, Novruzally and Naurzali) is a village and municipality in the Jalilabad Rayon of Azerbaijan.  It has a population of 308.

References 

Populated places in Jalilabad District (Azerbaijan)